is an airfield located in Obihiro, Hokkaidō, Japan, operated by the Japan Ground Self-Defense Force (JGSDF). The airfield is situated close to JGSDF Camp Obihiro.

History
The airfield first opened in 1937 as an airfield for the Imperial Japanese Navy. In 1956, operation was taken over by the JGSDF. In December 1964, the airfield became Obihiro Airport with a 1,000 m runway. In December 1972, the runway was extended to a length of 1,500 m. In February 1981, civil use of the airport ceased ahead of the opening of Tokachi-Obihiro Airport in March 1981. It is still operational as a general aviation airfield ever since the opening of the new airport.

References

Airports in Hokkaido
Japan Ground Self-Defense Force bases